Qazan-e Beyk (also Romanized as Qāzān-e Beyk and Qāzān-e Beyg) is a village in Zangelanlu Rural District, Lotfabad District, Dargaz County, Razavi Khorasan Province, Iran. At the 2006 census, its population was 468, in 122 families.

References 

Populated places in Dargaz County